Bajal is a census town in Dakshina Kannada district  in the state of Karnataka, India.

Demographics
 India census, Bajala had a population of 9960. Males constitute 49% of the population and females 51%. Bajala has an average literacy rate of 76%, higher than the national average of 59.5%; with 52% of the males and 48% of females literate. 12% of the population is under 6 years of age.

References

Cities and towns in Dakshina Kannada district